Fly Ashtray is an American rock band, formed in 1983 in the Bronx, New York, by Chris Thomas, James Kavoussi, Eric Thomas, John Beekman and Mike Anzalone. At some point, Thomas and Anzalone left the band which led to Beekman moving from lead vocalist to bassist/guitarist, and then Kavoussi switched from keyboard to guitar. Glen Luttman joined the band at this juncture to play the drums.

Spoog, a side project, resulted with impromptu gigs when one or another member of the band was out of town. Anzalone and Kavoussi also played in Uncle Wiggly. Kavoussi has made solo records billed as Phoaming Edison. The line-up of Thomas, Kavoussi, Beekman and Luttman was stable for a lengthy period until Beekman's duties were taken over in 1998 by Dave Abel.

In 2003, Luttman requested a leave of absence from Fly Ashtray, and in the same year Eric Marc Cohen took over drum duties.

The band released two records on Shimmy Disc and worked with Kramer.

The band's music was featured in "Responsible Ballet and What We Need Is a Bench to Put Books On", a dance piece choreographed by Jon Kinzel, and performed at The Kitchen in New York City.

Discography

Albums
1990 - Nothing Left to Spill
1991 - Clumps Takes a Ride
1993 - Tone Sensations of the Wonder-Men
1998 - Sawgrass Subligette
2007 - Pantswind Folder
2009 - Reports
2012 - Fly Ashtray
2016 - We Buy Everything You Have
2017 - Grit Is The New Privilege
2019 - Why Are You Asking Me?

Singles and EPs
1987 - The Day I Turned Into Jim Morrison
1990 - Extended Outlook
1991 - Soap/BIP/Feather
1992 - Let's Have Some Crate
1997 - Flummoxed
2002 - Stop the Zockos
2008 - Doodnat Mahadeo

References

External links
Fly Ashtray's Bandcamp page
Fly Ashtray's MySpace page
Fly Ashtray's website
Good Trouser Press article on Fly Ashtray by Ian Christie
Last Plane to Jakarta profile of Fly Ashtray

Musical groups from the Bronx
Psychedelic rock music groups from New York (state)
Shimmy Disc artists